Ragnar "Lothbrok" Sigurdsson is a main character in the historical drama series Vikings, created by Canadian network History. He is portrayed by Travis Fimmel and is based on Ragnar Lodbrok, a 9th-century Viking farmer and warrior who raided Anglo-Saxon villages in England.

Throughout the first four seasons, Ragnar goes on a journey from being a farmer in his homeland, to being a fierce Viking warrior in England and becoming an Earl, to being crowned King of Denmark after the death of King Horik. After his death, the series shifts focus onto his sons.

Development
When the shows creators were looking to cast Ragnar, there were difficulties finding the right actor for his role. The shows producers considered mostly Scandinavian and English actors for the part. In an interview for the series, series creator Michael Hirst said that his wife "wasn't sure about their choice for Ragnar, and convinced him to wait a little longer for the right actor to come along." A few days later, Travis Fimmel sent in his reel, and they decided to cast him for the part.

During development of the series, series creator Michael Hirst originally wanted the series to be a one-off, with only one season airing. The series aimed to end with Ragnar dying after the first season. Hirst said: "When I was writing the show, Ragnar died at the end of season one, But actually when we were making it, I realised by the end of the season we were only on the start of Ragnar's journey." Ragnar would eventually die during the fourth season. Hirst and Fimmel recalled having an argument about the delivery of Ragnar's last speech in "All His Angels". Fimmel initially felt uneasy about it, but he was convinced of its importance and impact on Ragnar's sons, saying: "me and Michael spoke about how the kids will find out what he said. It’s all for them, he doesn’t believe it". Screen Rant commended Hirsts work on adapting Ragnar, saying: "Hirst did an incredible job creating a complex and vibrant character based closely on the historical and mythological stories of Ragnar."

Character history

Season 1

Ragnar and his brother, Rollo, return from a battle in the Baltic lands during which Ragnar has visions of the god Odin and his valkyries. Ragnar takes his son Bjorn to Kattegat, for Bjorn's rite of passage. They later visit Floki, who has been secretly building a new type of longship. Ragnar has yet another vision of Odin, standing on the shoreline. This convinces Ragnar to finally move on with his plan. After gathering volunteers, Ragnar, Rollo, and Floki embark on an unauthorized raid to the west. Lagertha violently objects to Ragnar's refusal to take her along. At sea, the crew are caught in a storm, which a manic Floki interprets as Thor proving his ship unsinkable. On land, monks see the ominous sign of a cloud shaped like a dragon. After a tense voyage, Ragnar's men land on the coast of England, near the monastery of Lindisfarne, which they proceed to sack. They kill most of the monks and capture the young Athelstan, whom Ragnar protects from death. Ragnar's warband returns in triumph to Kattegat, where the Earl immediately confiscates the plundered riches except for one piece per man.  Athelstan's faith and his vow of chastity perplex Ragnar, but he, nonetheless, gathers useful intelligence about the Kingdom of Northumbria. Based on this new insight, Earl Haraldson authorizes another raid on England. Now accompanied by Lagertha and the Earl's brother, Knut, Ragnar re-embarks post-haste, leaving Athelstan to mind the farm and the children. As the Vikings set foot on English soil, they are met by the local sheriff and a handful of armsmen, who invite the newly landed "traders" to meet King Aelle. Ragnar agrees, but his other warriors' distrust incites a battle in which the Northumbrians are slaughtered. The Vikings raid the Northumbrian village of Hexham with little bloodshed, as the villagers are gathered for Mass. Back on the beach, the raiders defeat a superior Northumbrian force under Lord Wigea, sent by King Aelle, and return to Kattegat. There, Earl Haraldson has Ragnar, who claims to have killed Knut, arrested and tried at the Thing assembly. The Earl fails to bribe Rollo to testify against Ragnar, and Ragnar is acquitted. As the raiders celebrate with Athelstan and Ragnar's children, they are assaulted by armed men. Although Ragnar's followers prevail, his companion Erik is killed. When Earl Haraldson's raiders assault Ragnar's settlement, Ragnar, Lagertha, Athelstan, and the children narrowly escape in a boat. Ragnar is severely wounded, and Athelstan saves him from drowning. The family hides in Floki's house, where the shipwright and his lover Helga slowly nurse Ragnar back to health. Aware that the Earl is watching Ragnar's friends, Rollo offers his services to Haraldson. Haraldson has Rollo seized and tortured in an unsuccessful attempt to discover Ragnar's whereabouts. Ragnar sends Floki to deliver a challenge to the Earl — a single combat with Ragnar. The Earl accepts, and the two meet in single combat that ends with Ragnar killing Haraldson. After Ragnar becomes the new Earl, he grants his dead foe a chieftain's burial at sea. During the following winter, Lagertha becomes pregnant and Siggy accepts Rollo's protection and his proposal to marry an Earl – himself. As spring beckons, three of Ragnar's ships sail up the River Tyne. After throwing the luckless Wigea into a snake pit, King Aelle prepares to meet the raiders in battle. The Vikings set up a fortified camp, assault the Northumbrian besiegers at night, and captures Aethelwulf. In a meeting with the king, Ragnar demands 2,000 pounds of gold and silver as a price for the Vikings' departure. Aelle agrees but demands that one Viking be baptised a Christian, and to Floki's scorn, Rollo agrees. Instead of paying the ransom, Aelle has his men attack Ragnar's camp, but they are bloodily repelled, ending with Rollo finishing off several Saxons single-handedly, in an attempt to prove he's still faithful to his gods. After Ragnar sends Aethelwulf's corpse to Aelle, the king finally pays the ransom but swears vengeance upon Ragnar as he watches the raiders depart. Meanwhile, back in Scandinavia, Lagertha rules in Ragnar's stead, accepts Siggy's offer of service, and suffers a miscarriage. As Lagertha is unable to conceive another son, Ragnar takes his family and followers to the temple at Uppsala to attend a great rite to the Æsir and Vanir. He pledges fealty to King Horik, who charges Ragnar with an embassy to Jarl Borg, a rival encroaching on Horik's lands. Siggy chides Rollo for not paying attention to his own advancement and sleeping with other women. Ragnar's embassy to Jarl Borg in Götaland fails, as King Horik rejects a compromise settlement about the contested land. Driven by ambition and jealousy, Rollo agrees to support Borg against Ragnar. In Kattegat, a disease kills many inhabitants, including Lagertha's daughter, Gyda, and Siggy's daughter. Lagertha asks the seer about Ragnar and her future but the seer refuses as he only sees misery. Underway, Ragnar meets and is attracted to the princess Aslaug, and they sleep together; she later reveals that she is carrying his child.

Season 2

Rollo battles Ragnar when Jarl Borg and King Horik's men clash. Rollo surrenders to Ragnar after admitting he cannot kill him. Ragnar negotiates an unsteady truce between Borg and Horik, then returns to Kattegat. Ragnar's attempts to reconnect with his wife are hampered when Lagertha learns about his affair with Aslaug. Ragnar's life becomes more complicated when a ship arrives bearing a visibly pregnant Aslaug. Rollo is placed on trial, but is freed by the lawkeeper, who has been bribed by Ragnar. Despite Lagertha's enmity towards Aslaug, Ragnar decides to take the princess as his second wife. Humiliated, Lagertha leaves Ragnar and Kattegat. Ragnar tries to stop her and pleads with her to return, but she rebuffs him. Ragnar's sorrow is multiplied when Bjorn rejects him and goes away with his mother. Four years later, Ragnar is married to Aslaug and has two sons, with a third child on the way. Ragnar finally announces plans to raid England. Horik and Borg arrive, but his resentment leads Ragnar to break the pact with Borg. Ragnar accepts Rollo back into his family, but forbids him from raiding. Aslaug thinks that Ragnar treats her as an idiot and prophecies to him that their next son would be born with a serpent in his eye. The Seer tells Ragnar that his sons will be more famous than him. Ragnar and Horik's men set sail for England, but a violent storm throws them off course. While exploring, they are ambushed by soldiers and several men are killed including one of Horik's sons. Athelstan saves Ragnar's life during the fight. They learn that they are in Wessex, which is ruled by King Egbert, a man described as similar to Ragnar. Ragnar and his men move deeper into Wessex. He believes the land's greatest wealth is its rich soil, which could support a Viking colony. Ecbert sends envoys to ask Ragnar to leave; Ragnar replies asking what Ecbert would be willing to pay. Meanwhile, Aslaug gives birth to a son with a serpent in his eye, thereby proving that she is a Völva. In the mean time, Jarl Borg remarries and decides to seize Ragnar's lands in retaliation for Ragnar breaking their truce. With all the able warriors gone, Rollo rallies the village's women, children and elderly, but Borg massacres them and seizes control of Kattegat. Rollo is forced to flee with Aslaug, her sons and Siggy. Ragnar meets King Ecbert, who questions his reasons for staying in Wessex and offers to grant him some land. Later, back at camp, one of Horik's ships arrives with news of Jarl Borg's sacking of Kattegat. Ragnar and his men set sail for home. Athelstan chooses to remain with Horik, but is later captured by soldiers after his hunting party is ambushed. Rollo hides Aslaug, Siggy and the other survivors at a remote homestead and tries to rally others to help them retake Kattegat. Ragnar returns home and finds his family. His happiness is soured by Rollo's revelation that they do not have enough men to defeat Borg. Ragnar wants to have sex with Aslaug, but she prophecies that they need to wait for three days before having sex else their next child would be born as a monster, but Ragnar pays no attention to her. Ragnar is surprised when a large group of fighters arrives led by Lagertha and Bjorn. Ragnar is overjoyed to be reunited with Bjorn. Concerned that Borg is heavily entrenched, Ragnar plans to lure him away from Kattegat. Ragnar and Bjorn sneak into the town at night and set fire to the winter food stores, forcing Borg to give chase. Ragnar engages Borg's forces in a bloody battle, and Borg's host is routed and forced to flee. Ragnar re-enters Kattegat. Aslaug tells Ragnar she is pregnant again but is afraid how the prophecy will impact their child. Ragnar visits the Seer and confesses that he wants both Lagertha and Aslaug as his wives. Lagertha gives Bjorn permission to remain in Kattegat with Ragnar, but chooses to return to her husband. A messenger arrives and informs Ragnar that Ecbert's forces have slaughtered Horik's men, with Horik and his son, Erlendur, barely escaping. King Horik returns to Kattegat, defeated by King Ecbert and with few of his forces surviving. Hungry for revenge, Horik tells Ragnar that they need the help of Jarl Borg again, since he has many ships. Aslaug is not pleased and asks Ragnar not to listen to Horik. Rollo is sent as emissary to Götaland to negotiate with Jarl Borg, the latter accepts the offer after consulting with the skull of his first wife. Jarl Borg returns to Kattegat to join forces with Ragnar, but during the night his men are burned alive and he is taken captive. Horik persuades Ragnar to delay killing Jarl Borg, in case his execution scares off potential allies. Ragnar visits the Seer who reveals that Athelstan is alive but spiritually torn. In England, King Ecbert proposes an alliance with King Ælla against the expected return of the Vikings. To win over a suspicious Ælla, Ecbert marries his son to Ælla's daughter to seal their alliance. Ragnar's call for an ally is answered by a mysterious Earl, who is revealed to be Lagertha. Aslaug tells Ragnar she is pleased that Lagertha is joining forces with him. Bjorn continues to be rebuffed by Þorunn, the slave girl. Rollo forces Siggy to admit she is sleeping with Horik. Horik tricks Borg into thinking he will escape his fate, but in the end Borg is led into town to be executed. Ragnar performs the Blood Eagle ceremony on Borg. Aslaug's prophecy comes to pass when she gives birth to a son with malformed legs following a difficult labour that almost kills both mother and child. Despite Ragnar's insistence that he should have no future in Viking society and must die, Aslaug keeps him. They name him Ivar the Boneless. Lagertha arrives in Kattegat with her ships and warriors. In Wessex, Ecbert receives Princess Kwenthrith of Mercia, who is in civil war with her family after murdering her brother. Sensing Floki's growing rift with Ragnar, Horik attempts to entice him to his side. After landing in Wessex, Ragnar decides on his own to send Torstein to inform Ecbert of their arrival, annoying Horik and Lagertha. Aethelwulf and a group of soldiers arrive, and he invites Ragnar to speak with his father. As a sign of goodwill, Aethelwulf returns Athelstan's bracelet to confirm that the monk is still alive. Despite Ragnar's promise of safety, Aethelwulf's group is ambushed by Northmen led by Erlendur. The entire group is slaughtered except for Aethelwulf who is allowed to escape. While reviewing old Roman texts with Athelstan, Ecbert sees a way to defeat the Vikings. Horik advances towards what he thinks is the Wessex army, but Ecbert catches the Vikings between two troops of cavalry and defeats them. Rollo is badly injured, but is recognised by Athelstan and taken back to Winchester. Ragnar names his son Björn Ironside, as he is unscathed. Ælla wants to destroy the remaining Vikings but instead Ecbert decides to offer them land and to employ them as mercenaries to fight against Mercia. Rollo is returned to the Vikings. Athelstan returns to Kattegat with the Vikings, admitting to Ragnar that he holds belief in both the Christian and Norse gods now. Horik's wife and children arrive in Kattegat and the village celebrates. Horik reveals his plan to kill Ragnar and his entire family. In return for a promise to marry her, Horik orders Siggy to kill Ragnar's children. Athelstan teaches Ragnar the Lord's Prayer. With reinforcements, Horik attacks Kattegat. Arriving in the main hall, he discovers Torstein alive, and sees that Floki and Siggy did not betray Ragnar. Ragnar and his closest circle kills Horik and claims his "King's Sword", while Ragnar's men slaughter all of Horik's children, save Erlendur. Ragnar then sits atop the iconic cliff Preikestolen.

Season 3

Ragnar, now king, wants to return to Wessex to claim the land promised by King Ecbert. His relationship with Aslaug has soured. When Lagertha announces she intends to raid with Ragnar, Kalf, her right-hand man, offers to remain and take care of Hedeby. When they arrive in Wessex, King Ecbert informs Ragnar that to receive their land, the Vikings must fight for Princess Kwenthrith to appease King Ecbert's nobles. Lagertha is unsure about joining, so King Ecbert offers her the job of leading the Viking settlers in Wessex. The settlers go to the land to farm, while the warriors defeat Kwenthrith's uncle's army. Floki resents Ragnar's fighting for the Christians. The Vikings begin climbing the mountain to fight Kwenthrith's brother and his army. She asks Ragnar to spare her brother. While Ragnar and his men fight their way up the hill, Aethelwulf's archers surround Kwenthrith's brother, killing many and forcing him to surrender. Ragnar finds out that Þórunn is pregnant. The Vikings arrives back. Aethelwulf learns that Judith is pregnant with Athelstan's child, and he is sent to the settlement. A messenger arrives to tell Lagertha that her earldom has been usurped by Kalf; she asks Ragnar to help win it back. Ragnar tells the men that they will raid Paris in the spring. Ragnar returns with Lagertha to speak with Kalf, although he decides not to help fight for Lagertha, and instead asks him to join the raid on Paris. Floki tells Ragnar that Aslaug slept with Harbard and that Harbard is another name for Odin. Þórunn gives birth to a girl that Bjorn names Siggy. A farmer returns from Wessex and tells Ragnar about Aethelwulf's massacre. Athelstan has a sign from God and tells Ragnar that he has been born again as a Christian.  Earl Kalf leads a fleet to Kattegat to join the raid on Paris, along with Erlendur and Torvi. Floki kills Athelstan while he is praying. Ragnar, heartbroken by Athelstan's death, carries his body up the side of the mountain for burial and asks Athelstan for forgiveness. Ragnar's Viking fleet, also reinforced by Earl Siegfried, arrives in Francia and prepares for battle. Emperor Charles is asked by count Odo to evacuate Paris, but he refuses. Ragnar shocks them when he decides to leave Floki in charge of the attack. Both Vikings and Franks prepare for the siege as the Christians pray for protection from the pagans. Queen Kwenthrith has killed the Wessex nobles and has broken her ties with King Ecbert. The king sends his son, Aethelwulf, to Mercia to force her back into submission. She informs Aethelwulf that her son, Magnus, was fathered by Ragnar. She eventually submits once Aethelwulf tells her about the massacre of the Viking settlement.
The Vikings attack Paris. Eventually, the defense holds, repelling the Vikings. While the Franks celebrate their victory, at the Viking camp the warriors have to deal with their wounded, including a badly wounded Bjorn, and Ragnar who has been thrown down from the walls. With the Vikings still recovering, Ragnar orders another attack. They manage to pass the bridge, but they are once again pushed back. Siegfried is captured and executed on Gisla's insistence. Although the Franks have managed to defend the city, a plague has spread in Paris that kills some of its inhabitants. Ragnar's wounds won't heal, leaving him weak. Trying to restore his leadership, he secretly meets the Franks; although offered gold and silver, Ragnar doesn't accept. He asks to be baptized and to be buried inside the city. The Franks pay gold and silver to the Vikings, but they show no sign of leaving. Many people are still shocked at Ragnar's christening,  The warriors place Ragnar into a wooden coffin and escort it to the gates of Paris, where they meet the Bishop. The coffin is brought inside the cathedral to be blessed, but Ragnar suddenly jumps out of the coffin alive. He takes Princess Gisla as a hostage and forces the guards to open the gates, allowing the Vikings to enter the city. Most of the Vikings then set sail for home, but a small party, led by Rollo, remain camped outside the city to maintain a presence for next year's raid. Emperor Charles is determined to gain his favour, offering Rollo land and titles, and his daughter in marriage in exchange for his pledge to defend Paris against future Viking attacks. While sailing home Ragnar tells Floki that he knows he is Athelstan's killer.

Season 4

Part 1

Part 2

Seasons 5 & 6

After his death, Ragnar is mentioned several times by surviving Vikings. He also appears in flashbacks throughout seasons 5 & 6.

Reception
Ragnar's development throughout the series has received very positive reviews and is seen as the role that launched Travis Fimmel into international recognition. USA Today described Fimmel's performance in Vikings as "engaging", while The Huffington Post called it his "breakout role".

See also
 List of Vikings characters

References

Drama television characters
Television characters introduced in 2013
Fictional characters based on real people
Fictional explorers
Fictional kings
Fictional murderers
Fictional murdered people
Fictional Norwegian people
Fictional pagans
Fictional swordfighters